Gråbo is a locality situated in Lerum Municipality, Västra Götaland County, Sweden. It had 4,195 inhabitants in 2010.

References 

Populated places in Västra Götaland County
Populated places in Lerum Municipality